Uroš Smolej (born 14 October 1985) is a Slovenian football defender.

References

External links
PrvaLiga profile 

1985 births
Living people
Slovenian footballers
Association football fullbacks
NK Triglav Kranj players